Mills Tower may refer to:

 Mills Tower (San Francisco)
 Mills Tower, building in the Mills Tower Historic District, Iowa Falls, Iowa